The Uganda Under-19 cricket team represents the nation of Uganda in under-19 cricket at international level.

Uganda has qualified for the Under-19 Cricket World Cup on three occasions—in 2004, 2006 and 2022. The team's best performance came in 2022, when it defeated Scotland in the 13th-place play-off. Uganda has won the ICC U19 Cricket World Cup Africa Qualifier twice, in 2009 and 2021, and placed runner-up on another four occasions.

History
A notable individual performance was Emmanuel Isaneez's 6/37 against Bangladesh in 2004, which at the time was the second-best figures in World Cup history.

As of 2021, the team was coached by former national team player Ivan Thawithemwira.

Under-19 World Cup record

Records
All records listed are for under-19 One Day International (ODI) matches only.

Team records

Highest totals
 235/5 (47.2 overs), v. , at Chattogram, 27 February 2004
 226 (35.4 overs), v. , at Diego Martin, 30 January 2022
 214/9 (50 overs), v. , at Colombo, 17 February 2006
 206 (45.2 overs), v. , at Chattogram, 23 February 2004
 197 (48.1 overs), v. , at Georgetown, 15 January 2022

Lowest totals
 46 (30.4 overs), v. , at Chattogram, 17 February 2004
 74 (33.3 overs), v. , at Colombo, 6 February 2006
 78 (33.3 overs), v. , at Chattogram, 25 February 2004
 79 (19.4 overs), v. , at Tarouba, 22 January 2022
 84 (33.4 overs), v. , at Colombo, 9 February 2006

Individual records

Most career runs
 238 – Hamza Almuzahim (2004-2006)
 191 – Pascal Murungi (2022)
 158 – Davis Karashani (2004-2006)
 138 – Cyrus Kakuru (2022)
 134 – Patrick Ochan (2004-2006)

Highest individual scores
 99* (148 balls) – Martin Ondeko, v. , at Chattogram, 27 February 2004
 65 (59 balls) – Cyrus Kakuru, v. , at Diego Martin, 28 January 2022
 64 (78 balls) – Ronald Lutaaya, v. , at Diego Martin, 30 January 2022
 64 (81 balls) – Patrick Ochan, v. , at Colombo, 17 February 2006
 63 (82 balls) – Pascal Murungi, v. , at Georgetown, 16 January 2022

Most career wickets
 17 – Patrick Ochan (2004-2006)
 14 – Emmanuel Isaneez (2004-2006)
 13 – Juma Miyaji (2022)
 10 – Davis Karashani (2004-2006)
 9 – Ronald Ssemanda (2004-2006), Joseph Baguma (2022), Pascal Murungi (2022)

Best bowling performances
 6/37 (9.5 overs) – Emmanuel Isaneez, v. , at Chattogram, 25 February 2004
 4/20 (6 overs) – Emmanuel Isaneez, v. , at Colombo, 17 February 2006
 4/25 (8 overs) – Juma Miyaji, v. , at Diego Martin, 30 January 2022
 4/29 (9 overs) – Juma Miyaji, v. , at Diego Martin, 28 January 2022
 4/43 (10 overs) – Ronald Ssemanda, v. , at Colombo, 9 February 2006

Squad

2006
The Under-19 team for Uganda which played in the 2006 ICC Under-19 Cricket World Cup was:
Hamza Almuzahim – Captain
Davis Arinaitwe
Emmanuel Isaneez
Arthur Kyobe
Dennis Musali
Patrick Ochan
Jimmy Okello
Raymond Otim
Danniel Ruyange
Ronald Ssemanda
Emmanuel Nakaana
Charles Waiswa
Roger Mukasa
Mauneek Solanki

2022
The Under-19 team for Uganda which played in the 2022 Under-19 Cricket World Cup was:
 Pascal Murungi (c)
 Ismail Munir (vc)
 Brian Asaba
 Isaac Ategeka
 Joseph Baguma
 Cyrus Kakuru
 Christopher Kidega
 Ronald Lutaaya
 Juma Miyaji
 Matthew Musinguzi
 Akram Nsubuga
 Edwin Nuwagaba
 Pius Oloka
 Ronald Omara
 Ronald Opio

Fahad Mutagana, Abdallah Muhammad, Raima Musa, Jaffer Ochaya and Yunus Sowobi were also named as reserve players.

References

Under-19 cricket teams
Under-19